Matthew Anthony Corral (born January 31, 1999) is an American football quarterback for the Carolina Panthers of the National Football League (NFL). He played college football at Ole Miss and was drafted by the Panthers in the third round of the 2022 NFL Draft.

Early years
Of Mexican  heritage, Corral was born on January 31, 1999, in Ventura, California. He later attended Oaks Christian School in Westlake Village, California, before transferring to Long Beach Polytechnic High School in Long Beach, California. He later stated he switched schools due to Oaks Christian being for "rich kids" that were "never going to have to work a day in their lives", as well as a physical altercation with a son of Wayne Gretzky that finalized his decision to transfer. 

Corral totaled over 11,000 yards with 123 touchdowns during his high-school career and played in the 2018 U.S. Army All-American Bowl. He originally committed to play college football at the University of Southern California then the University of Florida before eventually choosing Ole Miss.

College career

2018 season

During his first year at Ole Miss in 2018, Corral played in four games as Jordan Ta'amu's backup. He completed 16 of 22 passes for 239 yards with two touchdowns and one interception. As a result of his limited action in 2018, Corral was redshirted.

2019 season

Corral was named the starting quarterback entering the 2019 season. In a week 2 matchup against Arkansas, he completed 16 of 24 passes for 246 yards, resulting in a 31–17 win. In the game, he set career highs in attempts, passing yards, and completions, leading to him being named SEC freshman of the week. Corral led the Rebels to a 4–8 record in his first season as a starter, completing 105 of 178 passes for 1,362 passing yards, 6 touchdowns and 3 interceptions.

2020 season

In his first season under new Rebels head coach Lane Kiffin and offensive coordinator Jeff Lebby, Corral started every game of the abridged 2020 season and improved on his performance from 2019, passing for 3,337 yards with 29 touchdowns and 14 interceptions and he led the Rebels to the 2021 Outback Bowl, where he was named its MVP after Ole Miss defeated the Indiana Hoosiers by a score of 26–20.

2021 season

Corral tied the school record for touchdowns in a game with seven as a junior, throwing for three and rushing for four against the Tulane Green Wave. In what would be his final season at Ole Miss, Corral would lead the Rebels to a 10–2 record and a bowl appearance at the Sugar Bowl. Corral would finish the season with 258 completions of 378 attempts for 3,333 passing yards, 20 touchdowns and 4 interceptions. Corral declared for the 2022 NFL Draft at the end of the season prior to playing in the 2022 Sugar Bowl. There, he suffered a leg injury in the first quarter and was carted off.

College statistics

Professional career

Corral was selected by the Carolina Panthers in the third round (94th overall) of the 2022 NFL Draft. He suffered a Lisfranc injury in a preseason game against the New England Patriots and was placed on season-ending injured reserve.

References

External links

Carolina Panthers bio
Ole Miss Rebels bio

1999 births
Living people
Players of American football from California
Sportspeople from Ventura County, California
American football quarterbacks
Ole Miss Rebels football players
People from Ventura, California
Carolina Panthers players
Long Beach Polytechnic High School alumni